Korovesis is a Greek surname with reputed Albanian origins. Variations include Korovessis and Korovessi.

People
Aggelika Korovessi, Greek conceptual sculptor
Nikos Korovesis, Greek professional footballer
Periklis Korovesis, Greek author and journalist and a former member of the Hellenic Parliament